Lian (also Romanized as Līān) is a village in Baraan-e Jonubi Rural District, in the Central District of Isfahan County, Isfahan Province, Iran. At the 2006 census, its population was 201, in 51 families.

References 

Populated places in Isfahan County